A cyclin-dependent kinase inhibitor protein is a protein which inhibits the enzyme cyclin-dependent kinase (CDK). Several function as tumor suppressor proteins. Cell cycle progression is delayed or stopped by cyclin-dependent kinase inhibitors, abbreviated CDIs, CKIs or CDKIs. CDIs are involved in cell cycle arrest at the G1 phase.

Seven cyclin-dependent kinase inhibitor proteins have thus far been identified. They are named by the small letter "p" followed by their molecular weight in kilodaltons. They are p15, p16, p18, p19, p21, p27, and p57.

Associated gene and target

References

External links
 

Protein domains